Conchoderma auritum, the rabbit-ear barnacle, is a species of maxillopod in the family Lepadidae. It is found in Europe, Africa, and New Zealand.

References

External links

 

Maxillopoda
Crustaceans of the Atlantic Ocean
Crustaceans of the Indian Ocean
Crustaceans of the Pacific Ocean
Crustaceans described in 1767
Taxa named by Carl Linnaeus
Articles created by Qbugbot